Awesome Mix Tape vol. 6 is the fourth album by the ska/soul band The Pietasters. It was released in 1999 (see 1999 in music).

Track listing
 "...This Precious Record" – 0:24
 "Chain Reaction" (Eckhardt) – 2:46
 "Yesterday's Over" (Eckhardt/Goodin/Jackson) – 2:29
 "Crying Over You" (Goodin/Jackson) – 4:53
 "Everyday With You" (Eckhardt) – 2:25
 "What I Do" (Eckhardt) – 1:53
 "Chooch's Bitch" (Eckhardt/Goodin/Jackson) – 2:13
 "Can't Stand It" (Neamiah) – 4:01
 "Crawl Back Home" (Hansen/Jackson/Roberts) – 3:38
 "Wasted" (Eckhardt) – 2:35
 "Take Some Time" (Eckhardt/Goodin/Jackson) – 3:15
 "Spiderview" (Eckhardt/Linares) – 2:50
 "Somebody" (Eckhardt) – 2:37
 "Dub-Fi (Superdeformed Mix)" (Goodin) – 16:13
 "Menowannalikki-u" (hidden track) (Eckhardt) – 2:25

Personnel
 Stephen Jackson - vocals
 Tom Goodin - guitar
 Todd Eckhardt - bass guitar, backing vocals
 Rob Steward - drums
 Alan Makranczy - saxophone, backing vocals, melodica on "Crying Over You"
 Jeremy Roberts - trombone, backing vocals
 Toby Hansen - trumpet, backing vocals
 DJ Selah - additional vocals on track 8
 Jeb Crandall - Hammond B-3, grand piano
 Carlos Linares - additional trumpet, guitar on track 12
 Chris Bagarozzi - additional guitar on track 6
 Jon Wahl - additional guitar on track 13
 Todd Harris - backing vocals, additional percussion
 Brett Gurewitz - backing vocals, additional percussion, producer, engineer
 Mike Weiland - backing vocals, additional percussion

References

1999 albums
The Pietasters albums
Hellcat Records albums